"Settlin'" is a song co-written and recorded by American country music duo Sugarland. It was released in January 2007 as the second single from their album Enjoy the Ride, and their second consecutive number one hit. The song reached the top of the Billboard Hot Country Songs chart.  It was written by Jennifer Nettles, Kristian Bush and  Tim Owens. It was the theme song for the 2007 ACC tournament.

Music video
The music video was directed by Paul Boyd and premiered in January 2007. It was filmed in downtown Atlanta, Georgia. It is a fairly simple video, featuring the duo Jennifer Nettles singing into a microphone  performing the song against an all-white moving background on a rotating swivel circular stage with a full band. During the second verse, audience members are revealed and sing and dance to the song as the duo perform.

CD single
. "Settlin" (edit) - 3:25
. "Settlin" (video) - 3:35

Chart performance
On the May 19, 2007 chart, "Settlin'" received the exact amount of airplay among country radio stations on the Billboard survey as "Stand", the song which held the number one position the week prior. This was the first such occurrence in the history of the Hot Country Songs charts. According to rules established by Billboard, a tie in airplay is broken by whichever of the two songs had a greater gain in airplay compared to the previous week; as "Settlin'" had increased in airplay over the previous week while "Stand" had decreased, "Settlin'" was therefore declared the number one song on that week's chart.

Year-end charts

Personnel

Tom Bukovac – electric guitar, synthesizer
Kristian Bush – acoustic guitar, background vocals
Dan Dugmore – electric guitar, steel guitar
Kenny Greenberg – electric guitar
Tony Harrell – organ
Greg Morrow – drums, percussion
Jennifer Nettles – lead vocals, background vocals
Glenn Worf – bass guitar

References

2006 songs
2007 singles
Sugarland songs
Songs written by Jennifer Nettles
Songs written by Kristian Bush
Song recordings produced by Byron Gallimore
Mercury Nashville singles
Songs written by Tim Owens
Music videos directed by Paul Boyd